Bojan Malinić (Serbian Cyrillic: Бојан Малинић; born 8 September 1990) is a Serbian football striker.

Club career
On 4 February 2008, he joined Red Star Belgrade but never played any official match with them, instead he was loaned to FK Srem and FK Beograd to gain experience.

References

External links
 
 and stats at Srbijafudbal
 Profile at Red Star official website

1990 births
Living people
Footballers from Zagreb
Serbs of Croatia
Association football forwards
Serbian footballers
Croatian footballers
FK Srem players
FK Beograd players
SK Rapid Wien players
FC Bihor Oradea players
Besa Kavajë players
FK Radnički 1923 players
FK Sinđelić Beograd players
Austrian Regionalliga players
Liga II players
Kategoria Superiore players
Serbian SuperLiga players
Serbian First League players
Serbian expatriate footballers
Expatriate footballers in Austria
Serbian expatriate sportspeople in Austria
Expatriate footballers in Romania
Serbian expatriate sportspeople in Romania
Expatriate footballers in Albania
Serbian expatriate sportspeople in Albania